The 2010-11 FFHG Division 1 season was contested by 14 teams, and saw the Bisons de Neuilly-sur-Marne win the championship. They were promoted to the Ligue Magnus as result. The Castors d’Avignon and the Chiefs de Deuil-Garges were relegated to FFHG Division 2.

Regular season

Playoffs

External links
Season on hockeyarchives.info

FFHG Division 1 seasons
2
Fra